Tsai Wen-Chi is an impact crater on the planet Mercury. It is located northwest of the larger Rodin crater.  It is named for the Chinese composer Cai Yan. Its name was approved by the International Astronomical Union in 1976.

Tsai Wen-Chi contains hollows.

Views

References

Impact craters on Mercury